The Canton of La Courtine  is a former canton situated in the Creuse département and in the Limousin region of central France. It was disbanded following the French canton reorganisation which came into effect in March 2015. It consisted of 9 communes, which joined the canton of Auzances in 2015. It had 1,678 inhabitants (2012).

Geography 

A farming area, with the town of La Courtine, in the arrondissement of Aubusson, at its centre. The altitude varies from  595m (Clairavaux) to 936m (Saint-Oradoux-de-Chirouze) with an average altitude of 760m.

The canton comprised 9 communes:

Beissat
Clairavaux
La Courtine
Magnat-l'Étrange
Malleret
Le Mas-d'Artige
Saint-Martial-le-Vieux
Saint-Merd-la-Breuille
Saint-Oradoux-de-Chirouze

Population

See also 
 Arrondissements of the Creuse department
 Cantons of the Creuse department
 Communes of the Creuse department

References

Former cantons of Creuse
2015 disestablishments in France
States and territories disestablished in 2015